The 2024 Hockey5s World Cup will be the first edition of the FIH Hockey5s World Cup, the quadrennial world championship for men's and women's national hockey5s teams organized by the FIH. It will be held in January 2024, in Muscat, Oman.

Qualification
The top three teams qualified in the five continental champions stated below:

Men

Women

References

External links

 
World Cup
International field hockey competitions hosted by Oman
Hockey5s World Cup
Hockey5s World Cup